Jean Florence Augur ( Thomas; 24 March 1934 – 15 August 1993) was a British educationalist, special education teacher, and dyslexia activist.

Biography
Augur was born on 24 March 1934 in Cannock, Staffordshire, England. She was educated at Stafford Girls' High School and the City of Leicester Teacher Training College. In later life, she undertook a Master of Arts (MA) degree with the Roehampton Institute of Higher Education.

She began her career as a primary school teacher, but moved into remedial education after the struggles of her own sons with reading and writing and their subsequent dyslexia diagnoses. She championed the introduction of multisensory teaching into primary schools so that all children could benefit from the methods, and encouraged the teaching of dyslexic children within mainstream schools rather than segregated into remedial schools. She was headteacher of the Staines Remedial Centre from 1982 to 1989, and then education officer of the British Dyslexia Association (BDA) from 1989 until her death: in the latter role, she also advised the British Government on education policy.

In 1956, she married Frank Augur (1933–2017). Together they had three sons. 

Augur died from breast cancer on 15 August 1993 in Esher, Surrey, England: she was aged 59.

Selected works

References

1934 births
1993 deaths
British schoolteachers
British women educators
Special educators
Dyslexia researchers
Alumni of the University of Roehampton
People from Stafford
People from Cannock
Deaths from breast cancer